The Rockefeller Brothers Fund (RBF) is a philanthropic foundation created and run by members of the Rockefeller family. It was founded in New York City in 1940 as the primary philanthropic vehicle for the five third-generation Rockefeller brothers: John, Nelson, Laurance, Winthrop and David. It is distinct from the Rockefeller Foundation. The Rockefellers are an industrial, political and banking family that made one of the world's largest fortunes in the oil business during the late 19th and early 20th centuries.

The Fund's stated mission is to "advance social change that contributes to a more just, sustainable, and peaceful world." The current president of RBF is Stephen Heintz, who was appointed to the post in 2000. Valerie Rockefeller serves as RBF's chairwoman. She succeeded Richard Rockefeller, the fifth child of David Rockefeller, who served as RBF's chairman until 2013.

The Rockefeller Brothers Fund is part of the Steering Group of the Foundations Platform F20, an international network of foundations and philanthropic organizations.

History
The Rockefeller Brothers Fund was established in 1940 by the five sons of John D. Rockefeller Jr. The five Rockefeller brothers served as the Fund's first five trustees. In 1951, the Fund grew substantially when it received a $58 million endowment from John D. Rockefeller Jr.

As the RBF's founding generation passed on, new family members joined the board, moving the Fund's giving further to the political left. In 1999, the Fund merged with the Charles E. Culpeper Foundation.

In November 2006, David Rockefeller pledged $225 million to the Fund that would create the David Rockefeller Global Development Fund after his death.

In September 2014, the Rockefeller Brothers Fund announced that it planned to divest its assets from fossil fuels. On disinvesting from fossil fuels, the president of the Rockefeller Brothers Fund, Stephen Heintz, said: "We see this as both a moral imperative and an economic opportunity" (30 September 2014).

The Rockefeller Family Fund and the Rockefeller Brothers Fund are independent, distinct institutions.

Special Studies Project

From 1956 to 1960, the Fund financed a study conceived by its then president, Nelson Rockefeller, to analyze the challenges facing the United States. Henry Kissinger was recruited to direct the project. Seven panels were constituted that looked at issues including military strategy, foreign policy, international economic strategy, governmental reorganization, and the nuclear arms race.

The military subpanel's report was rush-released about two months after the USSR launched Sputnik in October 1957. Rockefeller urged the Republican Party to adopt the finding of the Special Studies Project as its platform. The findings of the project formed the framework of Nelson Rockefeller's 1960 presidential election platform. The project was published in its entirety in 1961 as Prospect for America: The Rockefeller Panel Reports. The archival study papers are stored in the Rockefeller Archive Center at the family estate.

Presidents
Nelson Rockefeller (1956-1958)
Laurance Rockefeller (1958-1968)
Dana S. Creel (1968-1975)
William M. Dietel (1975-1987)
Colin G. Campbell (1987-2000)
Stephen B. Heintz (2001–present)

Further reading
Harr, John Ensor, and Peter J. Johnson, The Rockefeller Century: Three Generations of America's Greatest Family, New York: Charles Scribner's Sons, 1988.
Nielsen, Waldemar, The Big Foundations, New York: Cambridge University Press, 1973.
Rockefeller, David, Memoirs, New York: Random House, 2002.

References

External links

Institutions founded by the Rockefeller family
Political and economic research foundations in the United States
Pocantico Hills, New York